was a feudal domain under the Tokugawa shogunate of Edo period Japan, located in Kawachi Province in what is now the southeastern  portion of modern-day Osaka Prefecture. It was centered around Tannan jin'ya  in what is now the city of Matsubara and was controlled by the fudai daimyō Takagi clan all of its history.

History
Takagi Masatsugu was the son of Takagi Kiyohide, one of Tokugawa Ieyasu's 16 Generals. With holdings of 9000 koku scattered across Sagami, Musashi, Kazusa, Shimōsa, and Ōmi Province, he was ranked as a hatamoto. This placed his kokudaka over the 10,000 koku mark requited to qualify as a daimyō, and his holdings were consolidated to 22 village in Kawachi Province,where he constructed a jin'ya.

His son, Takagi Masanari acquired an additional 3000 koku in Kazusa and Awa Provinces, but the 3rd daimyō, Takagi Masahiro distributed 1500 koku each to his two younger brothers. During the tenure of the 6th daimyō, Takagi Masanobu,the domain received an exemption from the sankin kōtai requirement to travel to Edo on alternative years to attend the Shogun's court. Instead, the daimyō of the domain resided permanently in Edo, and managed the domain's affairs though a daikan and other officials. In 1769, under the 8th daimyō, Takagi Masanori, a widespread peasant's revolt occurred in the domain which resulted in22 village headmen being summoned to the domain's Edo residence. As a result, the Shogunate blamed Masanori for mismanagement and banned him from entering Edo Castle. During the Bakumatsu period, the 12th daimyō, Takagi Masahiro was ordered to dispatch troops in 1866 to suppress a revolt which had arisen in tenryō territory in what is now Kashiwara. The clan's finances, which had been in arrears since the mid-Edo period were close to collapse, with debts exceeding 39,000 ryō. In 1868,the han school, "Tannan Gakkō" was opened. The final daimyō, Takagi Masayoshi, served as imperial governor until the abolition of the han system in 1871. He was ennobled with the kazoku peerage title of viscount (shishaku) in 1884.

The site of the jin'ya became a field of private land in 1921 and there now no trace left. An archaeological excavation in 1999 confirmed the foundations of the jin'ya and the han school.

Holdings at the end of the Edo period
As with most domains in the han system, Tannan Domain consisted of several discontinuous territories calculated to provide the assigned kokudaka, based on periodic cadastral surveys and projected agricultural yields. 

Kawachi Province 
2 villages in Shiki District
12 villages in Tannan District
6 villages in Tanboku District
Shimotsuke Province
4 villages in Ashikaga District

List of daimyō 

{| class=wikitable
! #||Name || Tenure || Courtesy title || Court Rank || kokudaka
|-
|colspan=6|  Takagi clan, 1623-1871 (fudai)
|-
||1||||1623 - 1631||Mondo-no-sho (主水正)|| Junior 5th Rank, Lower Grade (従五位下)||10,000 koku
|-
||2||||1631 - 1635||Mondo-no-sho (主水正)|| Junior 5th Rank, Lower Grade (従五位下)||10,000 koku
|-
||3||||1635 - 1658||Mondo-no-sho (主水正)|| Junior 5th Rank, Lower Grade (従五位下)||10,000 koku
|-
||4||||1658 - 1670||Mondo-no-sho (主水正)|| Junior 5th Rank, Lower Grade (従五位下)||10,000 koku
|-
||5||||1670 - 1681||Buzen-no-kami (肥前守)||Junior 5th Rank, Lower Grade (従五位下)||10,000 koku
|-
||6||||1681 - 1741||Mondo-no-sho (主水正)|| Junior 5th Rank, Lower Grade (従五位下)||10,000 koku
|-
||7||||1741 - 1743||Wakasa-no-kami (若狭守)|| Junior 5th Rank, Lower Grade (従五位下)||10,000 koku
|-
||8||||1743 - 1780|| Mondo-no-sho (主水正)|| Junior 5th Rank, Lower Grade (従五位下)||10,000 koku
|-
||9||||1780 - 1781|| Mondo-no-sho (主水正)|| Junior 5th Rank, Lower Grade (従五位下)||10,000 koku
|-
||10||||1781 - 1826|| Mondo-no-sho (主水正)|| Junior 5th Rank, Lower Grade (従五位下)||10,000 koku
|-
||11||||1826 - 1848|| Mondo-no-sho (主水正)|| Junior 5th Rank, Lower Grade (従五位下)||10,000 koku
|-
||12||||1848 - 1869||Mondo-no-sho (主水正)|| Junior 5th Rank, Lower Grade (従五位下)||10,000 koku
|-
||13||||1869 - 1871||Buzen-no-kami (肥前守)||Junior 5th Rank, Lower Grade (従五位下)||10,000 koku
|-
|}

See also 
 List of Han
 Abolition of the han system

Further reading
 Bolitho, Harold. (1974). Treasures Among Men: The Fudai Daimyo in Tokugawa Japan. New Haven: Yale University Press.  ;  OCLC 185685588

References

Domains of Japan
1623 establishments in Japan
States and territories established in 1623
1871 disestablishments in Japan
States and territories disestablished in 1871
Kawachi Province
History of Osaka Prefecture